June Rose Callwood,  (June 2, 1924 – April 14, 2007) was a Canadian journalist, author and social activist. She was known as "Canada's Conscience".

Callwood achieved acclaim and a loyal following for her articles and columns written for national newspapers and magazines, including Maclean's and Chatelaine. She solidified her name by founding charities focused on certain communities in Canada, including Nellie's, one of Canada's first shelters for women in crisis, Jessie's Centre for Teenagers, now the June Callwood Centre for Women and Families, and Casey House, Canada's first HIV/AIDS hospice.

Childhood 
Callwood was born in Chatham, Ontario and grew up in nearby Belle River, with her younger sister Jane.  Her mother was the daughter of a Métis bootlegger and her father was the son of a magistrate. Her parents' marriage was deeply troubled, and despite the affection shown to her by her grandparents, Callwood's childhood was marked by adversity. They were desperately poor, moving at night from one house to another. Finally her childhood came to an abrupt end when her father left the family and she was forced to drop out of high school to earn an income.

Career
Callwood began her journalism career at her high school, Brantford Collegiate Institute, where she was editor of the school paper. She later worked for the Brantford Expositor, as a cub reporter. During this time, in the midst of World War II, June was earning $7.50 a week, half of which she gave to her mother for rent. In 1942, she was offered a job with The Globe and Mail and moved to Toronto. She married journalist Trent Frayne two years later, but continued to use her own surname because The Globe and Mail at that time did not employ married women.

Callwood left The Globe and Mail to raise a family but later resumed her career by becoming a freelance journalist, writing books and magazine pieces, many for Maclean's. In the spring of  1957, she interviewed Elvis Presley in Toronto, during the singer's first tour of Canada.  Soon after, she ghost-wrote autobiographies for such prominent Americans as broadcaster Barbara Walters, film director Otto Preminger and Dr. Charles William Mayo. Frayne and Callwood also hosted the CBC Television talk show The Fraynes in the 1954-55 television season.

Callwood later entered television journalism, hosting the series In Touch on CBC Television from 1975 to 1978. She also hosted two series, National Treasure and Caregiving with June Callwood, for Vision TV.

Callwood's career was marked by a strong concern for social justice, especially on issues affecting children and women. She became one of Canada's most famous social justice activists, founding or co-founding over 50 Canadian social action organizations including youth and women's hostels. She founded Casey House (a Toronto hospice for people with AIDS), Jessie's (now called Jessie's: The June Callwood Centre for Young Women), PEN Canada, the Canadian Civil Liberties Association, and Feminists Against Censorship.

In 2004, Callwood went public about her battle with cancer. She refused treatment and continued to be active until she succumbed to the disease in the morning of April 14, 2007. Callwood was last seen on TV on April 2, 2007 in the CBC show The Hour, interviewed by George Stroumboulopoulos.

A biography, written by Anne Dublin and entitled June Callwood: A Life of Action, was published in March 2007.

Activism 
Despite her rich career, Callwood felt the strong urge to not simply write about the injustice she came across as a journalist, but also to intervene. Charities Callwood founded include:

 Digger House (established in the 1960s), a shelter for homeless youth
 Nellie's (1974), one of Canada's first shelters for women in crisis
 Jessie's Centre (1982), a centre for pregnant teens and young mothers
Casey House (1988) a residence for patients with HIV/AIDS. At the beginning of its establishment, Casey House was the first hospice in the world to provide support and palliative care for people with HIV/AIDS.

Callwood was also a founding member of PEN Canada and Maggie's Toronto Prostitutes' Community Service Project. She fought for women's right to reproductive choice at a particularly contentious time. She also co-founded the Canadian Civil Liberties Association and Feminists Against Censorship, wading into three bitter debates about pornography and freedom of expression.

Honours
In 1978, Callwood was made a member of the Order of Canada. She was promoted to Officer in 1985, and promoted again to Companion in 2000. In 1988, she was awarded the Order of Ontario. She was inducted into the Etobicoke Hall of Fame in 1992.

In 2004, the City of Toronto noted its intention to name a street in Callwood's honour. Callwood requested that an existing street not be renamed for her, and specified that it be a new or currently unnamed street near a school or a playground. June Callwood Way is in the neighbourhood of Queen Street East and Broadview Avenue.

June Callwood was named Toronto Humanist of the Year 2004 by The Humanist Association of Toronto. This yearly honour is presented by H.A.T. to men and women who, in their actions, and creative endeavours, exemplify the principles of Humanism: a commitment to reason, compassion, ethics and human dignity.

In July 2005, a Toronto park was named after Callwood. A professorship in social justice was also established at Victoria College, University of Toronto in her honour.  In 2008, Premier Dalton McGuinty declared June 2 of every year to be June Callwood Day.

In 2011, June Rose Callwood Public School, located at 84 Edward Street in St. Thomas, Ontario, was named in her honour.

Personal life
Callwood and Frayne had four children together: two daughters and two sons. The daughters are noted authors Jesse and Jill Frayne, and the elder son is Brant Frayne. The second son and youngest child, Casey Frayne, was killed on April 19, 1982, when he was 20 years old, by a drunk driver on Highway 401 as he returned home from Queen's University. This tragedy incited her neighbour John Bates to start a campaign against drunk driving, which resulted in the founding of Citizens Against Impaired Driving (CAID) which is now MADD Canada, the Canadian branch of Mothers Against Drunk Driving. Callwood's own death came only days before the 25th anniversary of her son's death.

Despite Callwood's accomplished activism career, she faced obstacles that attacked her public image. In 1968 she was arrested and briefly spent time in the Don Jail after siding with homeless Yorkville children in a battle with police. But her most painful passage  was in 1991, while on the board at Nellie's, when a number of women she considered friends failed to stand up for her in the face of unfounded allegations of racism. "Nobody asked what happened," says Callwood, "you didn't have to do anything in those days. You just had to be in the way of legitimate rage. It woke people up...but a few of us got our heads kicked in." This controversy forced June to withdraw from public life for a time. Although many who knew her defended her vigorously, and some vindication came her way when she was awarded the Harmony Award in 2003 for her work in fighting discrimination, she was deeply wounded.

Callwood eventually returned to work despite the damage done to her reputation, focusing most particularly on being spokesperson for the Campaign Against Child Poverty.

During this low period of forced withdrawal from the public, at age 70 Callwood obtained her pilot's licence and maintained the licence throughout her life. "I wanted something to get above the muck and I guess I did it more literally than most people," June said.

In response to all of the honours Callwood had received, she was known to laugh at the irony of all these accolades for a high-school dropout "with a criminal record," she was always quick to add.

Although Callwood was regularly dubbed  "Canada's Conscience," "Canada's Mother Teresa" and "Saint June" by the media, she generally shied away from organized religion. "I am missing a formal religion, but I am not without a theology, and my theology is that kindness is a divinity in motion," she said in a 2005 speech delivered as the first lecture in the June Callwood Professorship in Social Justice at Victoria College at the University of Toronto.

Selected works
Love, Hate, Fear and Anger — 1964
Canadian Women and the Law — 1974
The Law Is Not for Women — 1976
Portrait of Canada — 1981
Emma: A True Story of Treason — 1984
Emotions — 1986
Twelve Weeks in Spring — 1986
Jim: A Life With AIDS — 1988
The Sleepwalker — 1990
Portrait of Canada — 1991
June Callwood's National Treasures — 1994
Trial Without Endd: A Shocking Story of Women and AIDS — 1995
The Man Who Lost Himself: The Terry Evanshen Story — 2000 (about CFL player Terry Evanshen)

Archives 
There is a June Callwood fonds at Library and Archives Canada. The archival reference number is R5274, former archival reference number MG31-K24. It covers the date ranges 1916 to 2003. The fonds contains 14.6 meters of textual records and a variety of other media.

Notes and references

1924 births
2007 deaths
Canadian activists
Canadian humanists
Canadian secularists
20th-century Canadian non-fiction writers
Canadian television journalists
Canadian women journalists
Canadian social commentators
Canadian television hosts
Deaths from cancer in Ontario
Companions of the Order of Canada
Members of the Order of Ontario
People from Chatham-Kent
20th-century Canadian women writers
People from Essex County, Ontario
Canadian women television journalists
Maclean's writers and editors
21st-century Canadian women writers
21st-century Canadian non-fiction writers
Canadian women activists
Canadian women columnists
Canadian women television hosts